The name Old Colony Mennonites (German: Altkolonier-Mennoniten)  is used to describe that part of the Russian Mennonite movement that is descended from colonists who migrated from the Chortitza Colony in Russia (itself originally of Prussian origins) to settlements in Canada. Theologically, Old Colony Mennonites are largely Conservative Mennonites.

Since Chortitza was the first Mennonite settlement in Russia, it was known as the "Old Colony". In the course of the 19th century the population of the Chortitza Colony multiplied, and daughter colonies were founded. Part of the settlement moved to Canada in the 1870s, and the Canadian community, whose church was officially known as the "Reinländer Mennoniten Gemeinde", was still informally known by the old name.
When members of the Old Colony Mennonites then moved from Canada to other places, the name was kept.

"The Old Colony Mennonites represent one of the purest survivals of the Brethren or Anabaptist wing of the Reformation"; and are typically more conservative than most other Russian Mennonites in North America.

In 1990, Old Colony Mennonite communities could be found in Mexico, Bolivia, Belize, Paraguay, Argentina, Canada, and the United States of America; by 2013, the vast majority of Old Colony Mennonites lived in Mexico, where about 60% of the 100,000 Mennonites were affiliated with the Altkolonier Mennonitengemeinde and Bolivia, where about 75% of 70,000 were affiliated with the Altkolonier Mennonitengemeinde. A smaller group lived in Belize, where about 50% of 10,000 were affiliated with the Altkolonier Mennonitengemeinde. Smaller groups of Old Colony Mennonites also lived in Paraguay, Argentina, Canada and the US.

See also 
 Conservative Mennonites
 Old Order Mennonites
 Reinland, Manitoba

References

Literature 
 Huttner, Jakob: Zwischen Eigen-art und Wirk-lichkeit : Die Altkolonie-Mennoniten im bolivianischen Chaco. Berlin 2012.
 Schartner, Sieghard and Schartner, Sylvia: Bolivien : Zufluchtsort der konservativen Mennoniten. Asunción 2009.
 Cañás Bottos, Lorenzo: Old Colony Mennonites in Argentina and Bolivia : Nation Making, Religious Conflict and Imagination of the Future. Leiden et al.  2008.
 Hedberg, Anna Sofia: Outside the world : Cohesion and Deviation among Old Colony Mennonites in Bolivia. Uppsala 2007.
 Will, Martina E.: The Old Colony Mennonite Colonization of Chihuahua and the Obregón Administration's Vision for the * Nation, San Diego 1993.
 Redekop, Calvin Wall: Old Colony Mennonites: Dilemmas of Ethnic Minority Life, Baltimore 1969.

Ethnoreligious groups